The 1969 All-Ireland Under-21 Hurling Championship was the 6th staging of the All-Ireland Under-21 Hurling Championship since its establishment by the Gaelic Athletic Association in 1964.

Cork entered the championship as the defending champions.

On 14 September 1969, Cork won the championship following a 5-13 to 4-7 defeat of Wexford in the All-Ireland final. This was their 3rd All-Ireland title in the grade and their second in succession.

Results

Leinster Under-21 Hurling Championship

Semi-finals

Final

Munster Under-21 Hurling Championship

First round

Semi-finals

Final

Ulster Under-21 Hurling Championship

Final

All-Ireland Under-21 Hurling Championship

Semi-final

Final

Under-21
All-Ireland Under-21 Hurling Championship